The Val Shatsky oil field is a Russian oil field that was discovered in 2007 and located on the continental shelf of the Black Sea. It will begin production in 2018 and will produce oil and natural gas.

References

Black Sea energy
Oil fields of Russia